The Governor's Palace in Williamsburg, Virginia, was the official residence of the royal governors of the Colony of Virginia. It was also a home for two of Virginia's post-colonial governors, Patrick Henry and Thomas Jefferson, until the capital was moved to Richmond in 1780, and with it the governor's residence. The main house burned down in 1781, though the outbuildings survived for some time after.

The Governor's Palace was reconstructed in the 1930s on its original site. It is one of the two largest buildings at Colonial Williamsburg, the other being the Capitol.

History

Williamsburg was established as the new capital of the Virginia colony in 1699, and served in that capacity until 1780. During most of that period, the Governor's Palace was the official residence of the royal governor.

Construction and design
The palace was funded by the House of Burgesses in 1706 at the behest of Lt. Governor Edward Nott. It was built from 1706 onward. In 1710, its first official resident was Lt. Governor Alexander Spotswood who served as acting governor; the governor proper, George Hamilton, 1st Earl of Orkney, was absentee and is not known to have visited Virginia. Spotswood continued to improve on it until ca. 1720–1722, adding the forecourt, gardens, and various decorations.

Under Lt. Gov. Robert Dinwiddie, from 1751 to 52, it was repaired and renovated, including the addition of a large rear addition featuring a ballroom.

The exterior of the Governor’s Place inspired the design of the Sigma Nu Theta Chapter fraternity house at the University of Alabama.

Occupants
The seven governors who lived in the original palace included:
Alexander Spotswood
Francis Fauquier 
Lord Botetourt 
Hugh Drysdale 
William Gooch 
Robert Dinwiddie
John Murray, 4th Earl of Dunmore

Home to a colonial mayor:
John Amson, 1750-1751

It was also home to the post-colonial governors:
Patrick Henry, 1776-1779
Thomas Jefferson, 1779-1780

Destruction
Around 1779, Governor Thomas Jefferson proposed the remodeling of the Palace in manner in keeping with his neoclassical ideals. The proposal would have added a temple-like portico to the front and back.

However, in 1780, Jefferson urged that the capital of Virginia be relocated to Richmond for security reasons during the American Revolution. The new lodging for the governor adjacent to the current Virginia State Capitol building in Richmond is more modest in size and style, and is called the Governor's Mansion.

On December 22, 1781, the main building was destroyed by a fire. At the time, it was being used as a hospital for wounded American soldiers following the nearby Siege of Yorktown. Some brick outbuildings survived the fire, but were demolished during the American Civil War so they could be salvaged for building materials by occupying forces.

In the 1880s, as the C&O Railroad was building the Peninsula Extension east to Newport News, due to difficulties in acquiring right of way along the preferred route, temporary tracks were laid along Main Street/Duke of Gloucester Street in Williamsburg, passing through the area of the former Palace.

Reconstruction

Through the efforts of Reverend Dr. W.A.R. Goodwin, rector of Bruton Parish Church and philanthropist John D. Rockefeller Jr., whose family provided major funding, the elaborate and ornate palace was carefully recreated in the early 20th century.

The reconstruction was based on numerous surviving pieces of evidence. Archaeological excavations of the site revealed the original foundations and cellar, together with architectural remnants that had fallen in during the fire. Jefferson's drawings and plans from his proposed renovation have survived, conveying the interior plan. In 1929, while the project was already in planning, a copperplate engraving nicknamed the Bodleian Plate was discovered in England's Bodleian Library. The plate included renderings c. 1740 of the exterior of the palace, along with the Capitol and the Wren Building. Additional evidence included original artifacts and Virginia General Assembly records. The house, outbuildings, and gardens opened as an exhibition on April 23, 1934.

In early 1981, the Governor's Palace underwent significant interior renovation and refurnishing to reflect updated scholarship of the building and its furnishings. The renovation reduced the influence of the Colonial Revival style in favor of historical evidence, including records found at Badminton House in the UK.

References

External links

Colonial Williamsburg, Governor's Palace web page

Colonial architecture in Virginia
Houses in Williamsburg, Virginia
Colonial Williamsburg
Historic house museums in Virginia
Museums in Williamsburg, Virginia
Palaces in the United States
Government Houses of the British Empire and Commonwealth
1710 establishments in Virginia
Historic district contributing properties in Virginia
Rebuilt buildings and structures in Virginia
National Register of Historic Places in Williamsburg, Virginia
Baroque palaces
Governor of Virginia
Former governors' mansions in the United States